Luigi "Lou Little" Piccirilli December 6, 1891 – May 28, 1979) was an American football player and coach born in  Boston, Massachusetts. After Lou's birth, his father changed his family name to "Little", translating the Italian family name and moved his family to Leominster in 1896.  Little played football at Leominster High School where he was the team captain in 1910, his senior season. The 1910 team, led by Little’s stellar play, was Leominster’s first undefeated football team.  Little went on to play one postgraduate season for the Worcester Academy Hilltoppers  in 1911 before returning to coach his alma mater Leominster High School for one season in 1912. He served as the head coach at Georgetown College, now Georgetown University, from 1924 to 1929 and at Columbia University from 1930 to 1956, compiling a career college football record of 151–128–13.  Little played college football as a tackle at the University of Pennsylvania for the 1916 and 1919 seasons and then with the professional football team the Frankford Yellow Jackets from 1920 to 1923.  He was inducted into the College Football Hall of Fame as a coach in 1960. He appeared as Lu Libble in Jack Kerouac's novel Maggie Cassidy, a fictionalized account of Kerouac's early life.

Playing career and military service
Little, who graduated from Worcester Academy, played college football at the University of Pennsylvania. Little gained national attention as a varsity tackle during 1916 season and was named All-American, and again in the 1919 season.  Between those years, he served with distinction during World War I with the American Expeditionary Forces in France.  Commissioned as a lieutenant, he was promoted to a captain in the 6th Infantry Division.  He saw action in the Meuse-Argonne Offensive.

Coaching career
In 1924, Little accepted the post of head football coach at Georgetown and held the position until 1930, when he resigned to become head football coach at Columbia University.  Little was the head coach at Columbia from 1930 to 1956.  He was probably best known for two wins: the 1934 Rose Bowl when Columbia beat Stanford, 7–0, and a 21–20 win over Army in 1947 in which the Columbia Lions handed the Cadets their first loss since the 1943 season finale, snapping a 23-game undefeated streak.  At Columbia, Little coached future Pro Football Hall of Fame quarterback Sid Luckman and writer Jack Kerouac, who broke his leg playing in 1940.
Other players he coached include Paul Governali, Lou Kusserow, Cliff Montgomery and Bill Swiacki.

Personal life
Little was married to Loretta Donohue for 50 years. Following his 1956 retirement they lived in Barnstable, Massachusetts and Delray Beach, Florida until her death in 1977. 
Little died at a nursing home in Delray Beach, Florida on May 28, 1979, at the age of 85.

Head coaching record

See also
 List of presidents of the American Football Coaches Association

References

External links
 
 

1893 births
1979 deaths
American football tackles
Buffalo All-Americans players
Columbia Lions football coaches
Frankford Yellow Jackets players
Georgetown Hoyas athletic directors
Georgetown Hoyas football coaches
Holmesburg Athletic Club players
Penn Quakers football players
Union Club of Phoenixville players
Union Quakers of Philadelphia players
College Football Hall of Fame inductees
Worcester Academy alumni
United States Army personnel of World War I
United States Army officers
People from Leominster, Massachusetts
Sportspeople from Worcester County, Massachusetts
People from Palm Beach County, Florida
Sportspeople from the Miami metropolitan area
Coaches of American football from Massachusetts
Players of American football from Massachusetts
Military personnel from Massachusetts